Omnidirectional refers to the notion of existing in every direction. Omnidirectional devices include: 

 Omnidirectional antenna, an antenna that radiates equally in all directions
 VHF omnidirectional range, a type of radio navigation system for aircraft
 Omnidirectional camera, a camera that can see all 360 degrees around it
 Omnidirectional treadmill, a treadmill that allows a person to walk in any direction without moving
 Omnidirectional microphone, a microphone that can hear from all directions
 Mecanum wheel, a specially designed wheel that allows movement in any direction, such as that used by many robots in the RoboCup Small Size League
 Wingless Electromagnetic Air Vehicle, an electrically operated vehicle that can fly in any direction